Find My is an asset tracking app and service provided by Apple Inc. that enables users to track the location of iOS, iPadOS, macOS, watchOS devices, AirPods, AirTags and a number of supported third-party accessories through a connected iCloud account. Users can also share their GPS locations to others with Apple devices and view the location of others who choose to share their location. Find My was released alongside iOS 13 on September 19, 2019, merging the functions of the former Find My iPhone (known on macOS devices as Find My Mac) into a single app. On watchOS, Find My is separated into three different applications: Find Devices, Find People and Find Items.

After being released on iOS, Find My was later released on iPadOS 13.1 on September 24, 2019 and macOS 10.15 on October 7, 2019.

Features

People 
Find My allows users to share their GPS locations to contacts with an iOS, iPadOS, or macOS device for an hour, until the end of the day, or indefinitely. Once shared, others are able to see the exact location of a person's device on a map and can receive directions to the person's location. Notifications can be set, alerting a user when someone leaves or arrives at a set location.

Devices 
Users can find the location of their Apple devices and play a sound on the device at maximum volume, a useful feature if the device has been mislaid. A device can also be marked as lost, locking the device with a password and suspending sensitive features such as Apple Pay. Lost mode also allows a user to leave a message and contact information on the lock screen of the device. 

A user can also choose to erase a device, deleting all content and settings, which is useful if the device contains sensitive information, however the device can no longer be located after this action is performed. After the erase is complete, the message can still be displayed and the device will be activation locked. This makes it hard for someone to use or sell the device. An Apple ID password is required to turn off Find My, sign out of iCloud, erase the device, or reactivate a device after an activation lock.

Since iOS 15, users can locate their iPhone 11 or later for up to 5 hours after the phone battery was drained, or 24 if it was turned off by the user manually (SE 2nd and 3rd generation excluded), thanks to the power reserve. Meanwhile the iPhone Xr and Xs support the power reserve as well, those can’t be located when turned off. Apple hasn’t communicated on how the feature works and why it is exclusive to these models but it’s likely that the feature uses the iPhone U1 chip exclusive to the iPhone 11 and later.

Items 
With the release of iOS 14.3, third-party Bluetooth items and accessories with support for the Find My network accessory program can also be tracked, under a separate "Items" tab.  If something is lost but out of Bluetooth range, the app will display the last known location until another iOS, iPadOS, or macOS device is nearby. Similar to Apple's own devices, third-party items can be placed into a "lost mode" which prevents others from pairing to the device. Lost items can be identified from within the Find My app, allowing a user to see a message or contact information from the owner of the lost item. 

Unlike other "key finders", AirTags also use ultra-wideband technology to find lost items (if the Apple device used for searching supports it).

See also
 Find My Device
 iBeacon

References

External links 
 Overview of the Find My network architecture

2019 software
Apple Inc. services
IOS-based software made by Apple Inc.
iOS software
iOS
Internet geolocation